Angath is a municipality in the Kufstein district in the Austrian state of Tyrol located 2 km north of Wörgl and 13 km southwest of Kufstein on the northern shore of the Inn River. The village has 6 parts and acts as a dormitory suburb for commuters from Wörgl and Kufstein.

References

External links
 Official website

Cities and towns in Kufstein District